Global University is an online Christian university based in Springfield, Missouri founded in 2000 by a merger of the former ICI University and Berean University.  It is affiliated with the Assemblies of God, and is accredited by the Higher Learning Commission.

Global University offers distance education in the Pentecostal tradition.  Its three main languages of instruction are English, Spanish and French for undergraduate programs. Four schools comprise Global University: School for Evangelism and Discipleship, Berean School of the Bible, Undergraduate School of Bible and Theology and Graduate School of Theology.

Berean School of the Bible
Berean School of the Bible offers continuing education units in the following programs:
Ministerial Studies
Level One (Certified Minister)
Level Two (Licensed Minister)
Level Three (Ordained Minister)
Ministerial Studies with Leadership Honors
Bible and Doctrine
Church Ministries
Royal Rangers Organizational Leaders Diploma

Courses in these programs do not earn college credit.

Undergraduate School of Bible and Theology

The undergraduate school offers Bachelor of Arts (BA) and Associate of Arts (AA) degrees in Bible and Theology, Intercultural Studies, and Christian Education.  It also offers various certificate and diploma programs.

Graduate School of Theology

The graduate school offers Master of Arts (MA) degrees in Biblical studies and ministerial studies, Master of Divinity (M.Div.) degrees in Biblical language and Christian ministry, and Doctor of Ministry (D.Min.) degrees in Bible and Theology and Christian ministry.

References

External links
 Global University website
 ICI University Deutschland, a German affiliate

Universities and colleges in Springfield, Missouri